Alishewanella alkalitolerans is a bacterium from the genus of Alishewanella which has been isolated from water from the Lonar lake in India.

References

Bacteria described in 2018
Alteromonadales